The 2005 BBC strike was a strike of more than 11,000 BBC workers, over a proposal to cut 4,000 jobs, and to privatise parts of the BBC under the management of Mark Thompson. Much of BBC's regular programming was affected, with many programs being replaced with pre-recordings, and some being halted altogether, with those that remained suffering in quality due to the striking of many technical workers.

Background 
The BBC was in a fragile position, facing competition from other digital and cable broadcasting companies. The BBC is funded primarily by a television license and must convince the government to keep the license, and at the time needed to also convince the government to renew its government charter, which would expire the next year. The BBC was also facing conflict with the government at the time, after the BBC's unfavourable coverage of the Iraq War in 2003. An investigation, led by Lord Hutton, a former judge, found that the BBC misrepresented the government's position on the war, and engaged in sloppy reporting. The report - despite containing valid criticism of the BBC, was viewed by other sections of the media as an "establishment whitewash" - caused the BBC's chairman and director general to resign.

Mark Thompson was appointed as the new BBC director in replacement of those who resigned. In order to restore the BBC's reputation and reform it for the digital age, he cut budgets 15% across the board and removed 3,780 jobs. This would have saved about 355 million pounds (US$642 million) to reinvest in new programs. This caused anger across the BBC, and many workers went on strike.

References

Labour disputes in the United Kingdom
BBC
2005 labor disputes and strikes
2005 in British television
2005 in radio